Frank B. James (March 21, 1912 – December 9, 2004) was a brigadier general in the United States Air Force.

Early life
James was born on March 21, 1912, in Delavan, Wisconsin. In 1937, he graduated with a B.A. from the University of California, Los Angeles.

Army Air Corps
James joined the United States Army Air Corps in 1937. In June 1938, he graduated from the Advanced Flying School at Kelly and received his pilot's wings and the rank of second lieutenant. His first assignment was with the 79th Pursuit Squadron, 20th Pursuit Group.

World War II

In 1941, he was named commanding officer of the 50th Flying Training Squadron, 14th Fighter Group. He took command of the 55th Fighter Group in 1943. It was during this time that the 55th Fighter Group was deployed to the United Kingdom to take part in World War II.

James became Chief of Combat Operations, Headquarters VIII Fighter Command, Eighth Air Force in March 1944. In October 1944, James was named Director of Fighter, Headquarters Eighth Air Force. He held this position until January 1945, when he was named Director of Operations, Headquarters Eighth Air Force.

Cold War
Following his service in the war, James became commanding officer of McChord Field and was a member of the faculty at the Air Command and Staff College. He graduated from the Armed Forces Staff College in 1948 and held a faculty position there until 1950, when he was appointed U.S. Air Attaché to the Embassy of the United States in Moscow.

In 1951, James was named Assistant Chief of Staff for Intelligence and Assistant Chief of Staff for Operations, Headquarters Twelfth Air Force. James graduated from the Air War College in 1954 and that same year was named Air Force Assistant Director, Joint Intelligence Group, Joint Staff of the Joint Chiefs of Staff.

In 1956 James was again appointed U.S. Air Attaché, this time to the Embassy of the United States in London. Following that assignment, James was named Deputy Chief of Staff-Intelligence and Deputy Chief of Staff-Programs of the North American Aerospace Defense Command. His retirement was effective as of June 1, 1968.

Death
James died on December 9, 2004. He and his wife Laverle F. (1916–1988) are buried at Arlington National Cemetery.

Awards

References

People from Delavan, Wisconsin
Military personnel from Wisconsin
Aviators from Wisconsin
United States Air Force generals
Recipients of the Legion of Merit
Recipients of the Distinguished Flying Cross (United States)
Recipients of the Air Medal
Recipients of the Croix de Guerre 1939–1945 (France)
Recipients of the Croix de guerre (Belgium)
United States Army Air Forces pilots of World War II
University of California, Los Angeles alumni
Burials at Arlington National Cemetery
1912 births
2004 deaths
United States air attachés
American expatriates in the Soviet Union